James William Mitchell (12 March 1926, in South Shields – 15 September 2002, in Newcastle-upon-Tyne) was a British writer, principally of crime fiction and spy thrillers.

Biography

The son of a shipyard worker, Mitchell also wrote under the pseudonyms James Munro and Patrick O. McGuire. He received BA & MA degrees from Oxford. After graduating he tried numerous jobs, including shipyard worker and civil servant before taking up teaching, in his own words he taught, "for some 15 years in almost every kind of institution from secondary modern school to college of art". In 1968 Mitchell moved to London to concentrate on writing.

James Mitchell created the British television series When the Boat Comes In (BBC) and Callan (Thames Television), and wrote many other television scripts, including episodes of The Troubleshooters, the legal drama Justice and The Avengers.

Personal life
He married twice. His son had two children, his daughter has two children, and 3 grandchildren.

Bibliography

Novels
Here's a Villain! (1957), US Title: The Lady is Waiting
A Way Back (1959), also published as: The Way Back
Steady, Boys, Steady (1960)
Among Arabian Sands (1963)
Ilion Like a Mist (1969), also published as: Venus in Plastic
The Winners (1970)
The Evil Ones (1982)
Sometimes You Could Die (1985)
Dead Ernest (1986)
KGB Kill (1987)
Dying Day (1988)
A Woman to Be Loved (1990)
An Impossible Woman (1992)
Leading Lady (1993)
So Far from Home (1995)
Indian Summer (1996)
Dance for Joy (1997)

Callan
A Magnum for Schneider (1969), US Title: A Red File for Callan
Russian Roulette (1973)
Death and Bright Water (1974)
Smear Job (1975)
Bonfire Night (2002)
Callan Uncovered (2014) and Callan Uncovered 2 (2015) - short story collections edited by Mike Ripley

When the Boat Comes In
When the Boat Comes In
When the Boat Comes In: The Hungry YearsWhen the Boat Comes In: Upwards and Onwards

as Patrick O. McGuire
A Time for Murder (1955)
Fiesta for Murder (1962)

as James Munro
The Man Who Sold Death (1964)
Die Rich, Die Happy (1965)
The Money That Money Can't Buy (1967)
The Innocent Bystanders (1969)

The hero in his Munro books is a British agent named John Craig, who works, mostly reluctantly, for Department K.  Mitchell wrote the screenplay for the 1971 film version of The Innocent Bystanders under his real name.

Death 
Mitchell died in Newcastle upon Tyne on 15 September 2002. He was 76.

References

External links
 Platzer, David, 'The Man From Department K', Slightly Foxed, Autumn 2008

1926 births
2002 deaths
British thriller writers
British spy fiction writers
Alumni of St Edmund Hall, Oxford
People from South Shields
Writers from Tyne and Wear
20th-century British novelists